Morné Steyn (born 11 July 1984) is a South African rugby union player who plays as a fly-half for the Bulls and played for the South Africa national team, up until his retirement from international test rugby in October 2021.

Steyn has won an Under-21 World Cup, three Currie Cups, three Super Rugby titles, one Super Rugby unlocked, one Tri-Nations, one French Top 14 title and two British and Irish Lions series.

Playing career
With the Bulls, he was a member of the team that won Super Rugby in 2007, 2009 and 2010. In 2009 and 2010, he was the leading point scorer in the league. In the 2009 semi-final against the Crusaders, he kicked four drop goals, a league record for a single game.

From 2013 to 2020, he played in the French Top 14 for Stade Français. He made his debut on 30 August 2013 in a 38–3 win over Biarritz. Coming on in the 60th minute, he scored four points by converting two tries.

South Africa
In early 2009, South Africa coach Peter de Villiers stated his preference for Ruan Pienaar in the Springbok number 10 jersey despite Steyn performing very well in the Super 14 tournament. Steyn was on the replacement bench during the second Test of the 2009 British & Irish Lions tour to South Africa, when Pienaar's kicking game disintegrated.

On 1 August 2009, South Africa beat New Zealand 31–19 in their 2009 Tri Nations Series match in Durban. On only his fifth cap and his second start, Steyn scored all of the Springboks' 31 points (8 penalty kicks, as well as converting his own try). This broke several records, among them the record for the most points by an individual in a Tri Nations match, previously held by Andrew Mehrtens with his 29 points against Australia in 1999 (one conversion and nine penalties).

Steyn scored the most points by a player at the 2011 Rugby World Cup, 62 points.

In August 2021, having not played for South Africa since 2016, he was selected as a substitute for the deciding third test against the British & Irish Lions. He replaced Handré Pollard in the second half, and, as he had in 2009, kicked two late penalties to help South Africa win the game and the series.

References

External links

Profile on itsrugby.co.uk
Profile on ESPNscrum

Living people
1984 births
South African rugby union players
South Africa international rugby union players
Rugby union fly-halves
Rugby union players from Cape Town
Bulls (rugby union) players
Blue Bulls players
Stade Français players
Afrikaner people
South African expatriate rugby union players
South African expatriate sportspeople in France
Expatriate rugby union players in France